Preetz Priory is a former German Benedictine nunnery in the town of Preetz, Schleswig-Holstein. It operates today as a residence for ladies.

History
The monastery was founded in 1211 by Graf Albrecht of Orlamünde, nephew of King Valdemar II of Denmark. He founded it following a mystical experience which he later recounted happened while he was stalking a deer. After following it into a glen, the deer stood still and he suddenly saw a gleaming cross appear between its antlers. He felt that the site was a holy place which he called the Field of Mary and, to honor the vision, founded a monastery of nuns at a location some 2 miles (4 km) away. A monastery on the actual site of the vision was built only in 1260. 

Suppressed in the 16th century due to the Protestant Reformation, it became an aristocratic Lutheran women's convent belonging to the Schleswig-Holstein knighthood. It continues in this capacity.

References

External sources 
 Christian Stocks, Bernhard Schütz: Preetz. Ev. Adeliges Kloster, Ehem. Benediktinerinnenkloster Campus Beatae Mariae. Broschüre, Schnell & Steiner, Kunstführer Nr. 1030 von 1975, .

External links 
 Official website of Preetz Priory 

Preetz
Preetz
Christian monasteries established in the 13th century
Buildings and structures in Plön (district)
16th-century disestablishments in the Holy Roman Empire